is a video game published by ELF Corporation and the sequel to Dōkyūsei. Dōkyūsei 2 was released in 1995 for MS-DOS version and in 1997 for Microsoft Windows. A PlayStation version was released on August 7, 1997.

The player plays the role of a high school male student. In the winter vacation of the last school year (from 22 December to 7 January), he has to choose one girl to be his girlfriend. There are 15 choices for him to make, some are his classmates and some have to be met in the city. The player has to meet the girls and make friends with one of them until the relationship develops to a point that the girl is willing to become his girlfriend.

Characters 
Yui Narusawa (鳴沢 唯 Narusawa Yui): A girl who calls Ryunosuke "elder brother" (お兄さん, oniisan) and who lives with him.
Tomomi Mizuno (水野 友美 Mizuno Tomomi): A childhood friend of Ryunosuke.
Izumi Shinohara (篠原 いずみ Shinohara Izumi): A good friend of Tomomi. Ryunosuke cannot become Tomomi's boyfriend and Izumi's at the same time.
Yōko Minamikawa (南川 洋子 Minamikawa Yōko): A girl who always quarrels with Ryunosuke.
Minori Katō (加藤 みのり Katō Minori): A girl who works in a tuckshop called "Hiroko".
Karen Maijima (舞島 可憐 Maijima Karen): A girl who seldom goes to school since she works as a super star.
Sakurako Sugimoto (杉本 桜子 Sugimoto Sakurako): A student at High School 88.

The following girls are not classmates of Ryunosuke:
Kozue Tsuzuki (都築 こずえ Tsuzuki Kozue): A female schoolmate of Ryunosuke, two years his junior.
Misako Narusawa (鳴沢 美佐子 Narusawa Misako): Yui's mother; she lives with Ryunosuke.
Misato Nonomura (野々村 美里 Nonomura Misato): A girl who works as a tour guide.
Azumi Yasuda (安田 愛美 Yasuda Azumi): A girl who is a young baby-sitter.
Misa Tanaka (田中 美沙 Tanaka Misa): A girl who comes to Ryunosuke's town during vacation. Misa is also a returning character from the first Dōkyūsei, being a fan favorite.
Sachiko Nagashima (永島 佐知子 Nagashima Sachiko): The owner of the Nagashima hostel in Toji Onsen.
Kumiko Nagashima (永島 久美子 Nagashima Kumiko): The daughter of Sachiko, she wants to live in the city instead of living in the countryside.
Mirei Katagiri (片桐 美鈴 Katagiri Mirei): Ryunosuke's teacher at school.

Male characters in the game:
Aritomo Saionji (西御寺 有友 Saionji Aritomo): One of Ryunosuke's classmates. He has a rich family, although he is not particularly good friends with Ryunosuke.
Yoshiki Nagaoka (長岡 芳樹 Nagaoka Yoshiki): Another one of Ryunosuke's classmates.
Akira Kawajiri (川尻 あきら Kawajiri Akira): A classmate and good friend of Ryunosuke.
Shinkansen Tendō (天道 新幹線 Tendō Shinkansen): The PE teacher of the 88 high school who always torments his students.

See also
Dōkyūsei (video game series)

References

External links
 Publisher Official Site 
 
 
 Dōkyūsei 2 at GameFAQs
 

1995 video games
1996 anime OVAs
DOS games
ELF Corporation games
Eroge
Hentai anime and manga
FM Towns games
NEC PC-9801 games
PC-FX games
PlayStation (console) games
Super Nintendo Entertainment System
Sega Saturn games
TurboGrafx-CD games
Video games developed in Japan
Video games scored by Noriyuki Iwadare
Windows games